Totally Awesome is a television film produced by VH1. Totally Awesome directly parodies a number of 1980s movies, including Dirty Dancing, Soul Man, Footloose, Some Kind of Wonderful, Sixteen Candles, Teen Wolf, Better Off Dead, Lucas, Pretty in Pink, and The Karate Kid.

The film premiered on November 4, 2006, on VH1, and was broadcast to promote the film's DVD release on November 7.

Plot
Ben Stein introduces the film as a long-lost film from the 1980s, so a lot of the jokes are now outdated in 2006.

As the Gunderson family sets out on a cross-country road trip to their new home, boyishly handsome Charlie, blossoming dancer Lori, and highly intelligent Max all have their own ideas of what life will be like in their new town. When Charlie is singled out as the least popular senior on the very first day of school, kindly outcast Billie amiably agrees to show him the ropes and provide him with an illuminating crash course in the clique system. Meanwhile, Lori is shocked to discover that dancing has been banned in her new town and the only place to cut loose is at the clandestine dance sessions held in the garage of current janitor and former dance instructor Gabriel. Immediately forbidden from attending the highly secretive shindigs, Lori stealthily sneaks out to be with the kindly Gabriel as her feelings for the dance instructor grow and the pair set into motion a clever plan to usher in a new era of dancing around town. When Charlie vows to win the heart of popular girl Kimberly by competing against her athletic boyfriend, Kipp, in the upcoming school decathlon, lovelorn Billie quietly pines for the clueless newcomer from afar as he begins a rigorous training regiment with Japanese gardener Yamagashi. As his family struggles to adjust to their new life, reclusive genius Max continues working on a highly advanced home computer that soon draws the attention of the CIA.

Cast
 Mikey Day as Charlie Gunderson
 Dominique Swain as Lori Gunderson
 James Hong as Mr. Yamagashi
 Chris Kattan as Gabriel
 Trevor Heins as Max
 Nicki Clyne as Billie
 Brittany Daniel as Kimberly
 Joey Kern as Kipp Vanderhoff
 Teryl Rothery as Mrs. Gunderson
 Greg Kean as Mr. Gunderson
 Tracy Morgan as Darnell
 Tone Loc as himself
 Ben Stein as himself

Reception

Heather Boerner of Common Sense Media gave it 3 out of 5 and called the "VH1 spoof awesome just for '80s teen film fans."

David Cornelius  of DVD Talk wrote that the idea didn't work when it was called "Not Another Teen Movie" and again the filmmakers confuse "reference for punchline". He says the film "knows enough about its subject to come up with nifty joke ideas, but can't quite turn them into solid chuckle material" and concludes "This could have been a keen, fairly hilarious spoof, but instead it's a dry, overblown project that can't bother to follow through with its ideas."

References

External links
 
 

2006 television films
2006 films
2006 comedy films
American comedy films
American satirical films
American television films
Films set in the 1980s
Films shot in Vancouver
VH1 films
2000s American films